Beatriz Micaela Carrillo de los Reyes (born 2 June 1975) is a Spanish politician and social activist. She is as member of the 13th Congress of Deputies integrated within the Socialist Parliamentary Group, representing Seville.

Biography 
Born on 2 June 1975 in Palma del Río, in the province of Córdoba, she is of Romani ethnicity. A self-described Socialist "since (she was in) the bassinet", her father had been a clandestine Spanish Socialist Workers' Party (PSOE) member during the Francoist Spain era, who fought against truancy among the Gipsy kids. She undertook studies in Business Administration, earned a diplomature in Social Work and a Licentiate degree in Anthropology; she paid her studies with work in the street vending and in the orange industry in her native town.

A social activist known by her work as President of Fakali, the Federation of Gypsy Women Associations, she ran 3rd in PSOE list for Seville for the Congress of Deputies vis-à-vis the 2019 general election. She was elected member of the 13th term of the Lower House.

References 

1975 births
Living people
21st-century Spanish women politicians
Members of the 13th Congress of Deputies (Spain)
Members of the 14th Congress of Deputies (Spain)
People from the Province of Córdoba (Spain)
Spanish Romani people
Women members of the Congress of Deputies (Spain)